Salvia 'Indigo Spires' is a hybrid cross between S. longispicata and S. farinacea. It was a chance discovery at Huntington Botanical Gardens, found growing near the two presumed parents, S. longispicata and S. farinacea. Introduced into horticulture in 1979, and has become a very popular bedding plant.

The spike-like inflorescences reach , blooming from early summer to frost, with  small rich violet flowers that are very tightly packed in whorls. The  calyx is purple, staying long after the flower falls off.

Notes

indigo spires
Ornamental plant cultivars